George Ivory Wonsley (born November 23, 1960 in Moss Point, Mississippi) is a former American football running back in the National Football League. He was drafted by the Indianapolis Colts in the fourth round of the 1984 NFL Draft. He played college football at Mississippi State.

Wonsley has two brothers, Otis Wonsley and Nathan, who were also running backs in the NFL. 

1960 births
Living people
People from Moss Point, Mississippi
Players of American football from Mississippi
American football running backs
Mississippi State Bulldogs football players
Indianapolis Colts players
New England Patriots players